Mishrikoti  is a village in the southern state of Karnataka, India. It is located in the Kalghatgi taluk of Dharwad district in Karnataka.

Demographics
As of the 2011 Census of India there were 1,932 households in Mishrikoti and a total population of 9,006 consisting of 4,646 males and 4,360 females. There were 1,113 children ages 0-6.

See also
 Dharwad
 Districts of Karnataka

References

External links
 http://Dharwad.nic.in/

Villages in Dharwad district